HMS Dunkirk (D09) was a later or 1943  fleet destroyer of the British Royal Navy (RN). Though there were other ships of the Navy that had been named Dunkirk, as far back as the 1650s, it held added meaning after the evacuation from Dunkirk between late May and early June 1940, in which over 300,000 British, as well as French troops, were rescued by a ragtag fleet of ships.

Dunkirk was built by Alexander Stephen and Sons of Govan. She was launched on 27 August 1945 and commissioned on 27 November 1946.

Service
In the year of her commissioning, Dunkirk joined the 4th Destroyer Flotilla of the Home Fleet. In 1950, Dunkirk was placed in Reserve, as were many of her sister ships in the 1950s. She subsequently performed a variety of duties and in 1958, while in the Mediterranean, Dunkirk, in broad daylight, was hit by her sister ship  during Officer of the Watch manoeuvres off Malta, causing minor damage.

In 1961, Dunkirk, along with the cruiser  and the frigate , undertook a tour of the South American continent. Dunkirk finally returned home in 1963.

Decommissioning and disposal
In 1965 Dunkirk was listed as 'reserve' and later that year was scrapped at Faslane.

References

Publications

Battle-class destroyers of the Royal Navy
Ships built in Govan
1945 ships
Cold War destroyers of the United Kingdom